Multiclavula ichthyiformis is a species of terricolous (ground-dwelling) basidiolichen in the family Hygrophoraceae. Found in Costa Rica, it was formally described as a new species in 2007 by Matthew Nelsen, Robert Lücking, Loengrin Umaña, Marie Trest, and Susan Will-Wolf. Here, in a disturbed high-altitude peat bog in a rainforest, it was found growing on the ground along a brook and a road bank.

The fruit bodies are fleshy, unbranched, and lanceolate, with a fishtail-like lamina. The species epithet ichthyiformis refers to this latter feature. Its basidiospores are smooth and spherical, thin-walled and hyaline, and measure 4–6 μm in diameter. Other ground-dwelling lichens that were prevalent in this habitat included Cladia aggregata, Cladonia confusa, Dictyonema glabratum, Icmadophila aversa, Phyllobaeis imbricata, and Siphula ceratites.

References

Hygrophoraceae
Lichen species
Lichens described in 2007
Lichens of Central America
Taxa named by Robert Lücking
Basidiolichens